Dynasty Warriors is a 2021 Hong Kong fantasy-action film based on the Japanese video game franchise of the same title by Omega Force and Koei Tecmo. Directed by Roy Chow, the film stars an ensemble cast from Hong Kong, China and Taiwan, including Louis Koo, Carina Lau, Wang Kai, Tony Yang, Han Geng, Justin Cheung, Gulnazar and Ray Lui. The film was released on 29 April 2021 in Hong Kong, and in China on 30 April 2021.

Cast 

 Louis Koo as Lü Bu
 Carina Lau as the Master of the Sword Forge Castle
 Wang Kai as Cao Cao
 Tony Yang as Liu Bei
 Han Geng as Guan Yu
 Justin Cheung as Zhang Fei
 Gulnazar as Diaochan
 Ray Lui as Yuan Shao
 Lam Suet as Dong Zhuo
 Philip Keung as Zhang Jiao
 Law Kar-ying as Lü Boshe
 Eddie Cheung as Chen Gong
 Jonathan Wong as Cao Ren

Production 
On 15 March 2016, Suzuki Akihiro, the producer of Koei Tecmo's Dynasty Warriors video game series, and the Hong Kong-based company HMV Digital China announced at the 20th Hong Kong International Film and TV Market that they will be making a live-action film adaptation of Dynasty Warriors. The film will be directed by Roy Chow, produced and written by Christine To, and to be released in 2017.

On 8 July 2017, HMV Digital China's executive chairman Stephen Shiu Jr. revealed on his weibo that the film will start shooting on 11 July. He also revealed that he had approached Koei Tecmo four years ago and secured the rights to adapt the Dynasty Warriors franchise into a movie. On 11 July, Shiu announced that Han Geng, Wang Kai, Louis Koo, Tony Yang and Gulnazar are part of the main cast.

On 28 September 2017, director Roy Chow announced that after 63 days of filming in mainland China, the team will be moving to New Zealand in November 2017 to shoot the background scenes. While shooting in mainland China, Louis Koo sustained an eye injury but he insisted on staying until the end. However, Roy Chow refused to let him stay and sent him back to Hong Kong for medical treatment. As soon as he recovered, Koo rushed to New Zealand to join the rest of the team. Chow later said that he was very impressed with Koo's commitment and professionalism.

Shooting for Dynasty Warriors wrapped up on 28 November 2017. The pre-production phase took eight months, the principal photography phase lasted five months, and the post-production phase will take up to a year.

Release 
A teaser trailer for Dynasty Warriors was released on 19 March 2018, along with an announcement that the film was scheduled to be shown in 2019.

In March 2021, another trailer was released indicating a release on 29 April 2021 in Hong Kong, and in China on 30 April 2021.

Netflix purchased the film's global distribution rights with a record breaking eight-figure price for a Chinese-language film and was released for streaming on 1 July 2021.

Reception

Box office
As of 23 May 2021, Dynasty Warriors has grossed a total of US$3.31 million worldwide, combining its box office from Hong Kong (US$830,000), China (US$2.4 million) and Taiwan (US$80,000).

In Hong Kong, the film debuted at No. 1 on its opening weekend, grossing HK$2,945,449 (US$380,329) during its first four days of release. The film remained at No. 1 on its second weekend, grossing HK$2,224,136, and have grossed a total of HK$5,178,490 (US$670,000) by then. In its third weekend, the film grossed HK$970,601, coming in at No. 3, and have grossed a total of HK$6,149,091 (US$791,623) by then. On its fourth week, the film grossed HK$294,781, coming in at No. 6, and have grossed a total of HK$6,443,872 (US$830,000) so far.

In China, the film debuted at No. 9, grossing CNY¥9.29 million (US$1.44 million) after its first three days of release.

In Taiwan, the film debuted at No. 13 grossed NT$1.48 million (US$50,000) after its first three days of release. During its second weekend, the film grossed NT$810,000, coming in at No. 23, and have grossed a total of NT$2.33 million (US$80,000) by then. On its third weekend, the film grossed NT$90,000, coming in at No. 30, and have grossed a total of NT$2.42 million (US$80,000) so far.

Critical reception
Edmund Lee of the South China Morning Post gave the film a score of 2.5/5 stars, criticizing the film's humor and casting choices, but complimented its focus on story over action.

Writing for Polygon, Todd Harper believed the film struggled between its adaptation of Romance of the Three Kingdoms and Dynasty Warriors; he felt it was inconsistent in its interpretation of the plot, sometimes presented as a historical period drama and sometimes a wuxia, creating a "deep frustration at how scattershot the film is". However, he praised the action sequences and choice of music.

Robert Daniels of IGN scored the film 2 out of 10, noting a lack of character development, a bloated story that is incomprehensible to those unfamiliar with the games or the original source material, and poor direction and visual effects.

Notes

References

External links 

2020s Mandarin-language films
Hong Kong fantasy films
Live-action films based on video games
Films shot in New Zealand
Films shot in China
Hong Kong action films
Hong Kong martial arts films
2021 films
2021 action films
2021 fantasy films
2020s fantasy action films
Films set in 3rd-century Han dynasty
Films set in the Three Kingdoms
Films based on Romance of the Three Kingdoms
Action films based on actual events
Chinese fantasy adventure films
Films directed by Roy Chow
China Star Entertainment Group films